Mikik is a rural locality (a selo) in Tsakhurskoye Rural Settlement, Rutulsky District, Republic of Dagestan, Russia. The population was 532 as of 2010. There are 3 streets.

Geography 
Mikik is located on the Samur river, 31 km northwest of Rutul (the district's administrative centre) by road. Gelmets and Khiyakh are the nearest rural localities.

Nationalities 
Tsakhurs live there.

References 

Rural localities in Rutulsky District